Jason Matthews (born 20 July 1970 in Hackney) is a former boxer from England in the Middleweight (160 lb) division.

Boxing career

Amateur career
Matthews won the 1995 Amateur Boxing Association British middleweight title, when boxing out of the Crown and Manor ABC.

Professional career
Also known as "Method Man", Matthews turned pro in 1995 and won the vacant World Boxing Organization inter-continental middleweight title with a victory against Paul Wright in 1997; then won the commonwealth Middleweight Title against Paul Jones in 1998. He then won the middleweight interim title on 17 June 1999 with a victory against Ryan Rhodes. He was elevated to full champion when long-term injuries prevented the previous title holder, Bert Schenk, from defending the title. Matthews lost the title to Armand Krajnc by TKO in 1999 in his first defence. Matthews announced his retirement from boxing after the bout due to an eye injury, which occurred during the fight.

Professional boxing record

See also
List of world middleweight boxing champions
List of British world boxing champions

References

External links

Roll of Honour

 

1970 births
Living people
English male boxers
Boxers from Greater London
People from Hackney Central
England Boxing champions
Commonwealth Boxing Council champions
World middleweight boxing champions
World Boxing Organization champions